In geometry, the truncated great dodecahedron is a nonconvex uniform polyhedron, indexed as U37. It has 24 faces (12 pentagrams and 12 decagons), 90 edges, and 60 vertices. It is given a Schläfli symbol t{5,5/2}.

Related polyhedra 

It shares its vertex arrangement with three other uniform polyhedra: the nonconvex great rhombicosidodecahedron, the great dodecicosidodecahedron, and the great rhombidodecahedron; and with the uniform compounds of 6 or 12 pentagonal prisms.

This polyhedron is the truncation of the great dodecahedron:

The truncated small stellated dodecahedron looks like a dodecahedron on the surface, but it has 24 faces, 12 pentagons from the truncated vertices and 12 overlapping as (truncated pentagrams).

Small stellapentakis dodecahedron 

The small stellapentakis dodecahedron (or small astropentakis dodecahedron) is a nonconvex isohedral polyhedron. It is the dual of the truncated great dodecahedron. It has 60 intersecting triangular faces.

See also 
 List of uniform polyhedra

References

External links 
 
 
 Uniform polyhedra and duals

Nonconvex polyhedra
Uniform polyhedra